The Accountant is a 2001 American short comedy film directed by Ray McKinnon. In 2002, it won an Oscar for McKinnon and his wife Lisa Blount for Best Short Subject at the 74th Academy Awards.

The film tells the story of an accountant whose mathematical skills just might save the O'Dell family farm. The accountant takes the O'Dell brothers on a journey that explores the plight of America’s family farms and hidden corporate conspiracies. The film was released on video and DVD on November 3, 2009.

Cast
 Ray McKinnon as The Accountant
 Walton Goggins as Tommy O'Dell (as Walt Goggins)
 Eddie King as David O'Dell
 Gary Richardson as One-armed farmer

References

External links

2001 films
2001 short films
2001 comedy films
2001 independent films
2000s English-language films
American independent films
Films set in Georgia (U.S. state)
Films shot in Georgia (U.S. state)
Live Action Short Film Academy Award winners
American comedy short films
2000s American films